Rod Laver and Dennis Ralston were the defending champions, but Ralston did not participate this year.  Laver partnered Ken Rosewall, losing in the first round.

Bob Hewitt and Frew McMillan won the title, defeating Wojtek Fibak and Tom Okker 6–1, 1–6, 6–3 in the final.

Seeds

Draw

Finals

Top half

Bottom half

External links
 Draw

U.S. Pro Indoor
1977 Grand Prix (tennis)
U.S. Pro Indoor - Doubles
1977 in American tennis